Maria Victòria Peña Carulla (born 11 January 1954) better known as Vicky Peña is a Spanish actress.

She is one of the most important voice actors in Catalan and Spanish.

Family and early life
She is the daughter of the actors Felip Peña and Montserrat Carulla, and the mother of Miranda Gus.

She started working in the 1966 TV series La pequeña comedia. Since then, she has been nominated and rewarded with several prizes. In 2005, she was elected as Vice President of the Professional Actors and Directors Association of Catalonia.

Selected filmography 
Werther (1986)
La casa de Bernarda Alba (1987)
Entre rojas (1995)
The Good Life (1996)
Marquise (1997)
Secretos del corazón (1997)
El pianista (1998)
Em dic Sara (1999) .
Sé quién eres (2000) .
Morir (o no) (2000)
Noche de fiesta (2002)
Smoking Room (2002)
Piedras (2002)
El deseo de ser piel roja  (2002)
Las voces de la noche (2003)
Joves (2004)
El principio de Arquímedes (2004)
Con mostaza sabe mejor (2005)
Pactar amb el gat (2006)
The Apostate (2015)
Seis hermanas (2015-2017)

Theatre
El diccionario (2012-2014) by Manuel Calzada Pérez
Follies (2012) by Stephen Sondheim and James Goldman
A Streetcar Named Desire (2011)
Homebody Kabul, by Tony Kushner (2007)
Al llarg del Kurt (2006)
Els estiuejants (2006)
La Orestiada (2004)
Electra (2003)
Edipo XXI (2002)
La Mare Coratge i els seus fills (2001)
A Little Night Music (2000)Guys and Dolls (1998)La reina de bellesa de Leenane (The Beauty Queen of Leenane) by Martin McDonagh. Directed by Mario Gas (1998)Sweeney Todd, by Stephen Sondheim (1995)Othello, by William Shakespeare. Directed by Mario Gas (1994).Golfos de Roma by Stephen Sondheim and Burt Shevelove (1993)El temps i els Conway (Time and the Conways) by J. B. Priestley(1992)L’hort dels cirerers (The Cherry Orchard) by Anton Chekhov (1991)Les tres germanes (Three Sisters) by Anton Chekhov. (1990)Dancing! (1988)La balada de Calamity Jane (1987)Madre Coraje y sus hijos, by Bertolt Brecht (1986).L’òpera de tres rals, by Bertolt Brecht (1984)Les noces de Figaro (1977)Tirant lo Blanc, by Joanot Martorell (1976)El criat de dos amos'', by Carlo Goldoni (1974)

References

External links

Vicky Peña at Teatrebcn.com  
Vicky Peña as voice actress 
Vicky Peña at Teatrenacional.com 

1954 births
Living people
Stage actresses from Catalonia
Film actresses from Catalonia
Television actresses from Catalonia
Spanish voice actresses
Spanish stage actresses
20th-century Spanish actresses
21st-century Spanish actresses